HGG may refer to:
 Hackerspace Global Grid
 Haggerston railway station, in London
 Harlech Grits Group, a lithostratigraphic group in Wales
Heilig-Geist-Gymnasium, a Christian secondary school located in Broich in Würselen, Germany. 
 Henderson Group, a British investment management company
 hhgregg, an American retailer
 The Hitchhiker's Guide to the Galaxy, a comedy science fiction series created by Douglas Adams
 Hyperbolic geometric graph
Home for the Golden Gays, a Filipino LGBT non-profit organization established in 1975